This comparison contains download managers, and also file sharing applications that can be used as download managers (using the http, https and ftp-protocol). For pure file sharing applications see the Comparison of file sharing applications.

General information

Protocol support

Features

See also 

 BitTorrent client
 Comparison of file sharing applications
 Comparison of YouTube downloaders
 BitLocker

Notes

References 

 
Download manager